Friedhelm Ferdinand Sack (born 30 May 1956 in Mariental) is a Namibian sport shooter. He competed at the 1996 Summer Olympics, 2000 Summer Olympics and 2004 Summer Olympics for his country. He is affiliated with the Windhoek Central Shooting Club.

References

External links

1956 births
Living people
White Namibian people
Namibian people of German descent
Shooters at the 1996 Summer Olympics
Shooters at the 2000 Summer Olympics
Shooters at the 2004 Summer Olympics
Shooters at the 1994 Commonwealth Games
Shooters at the 1998 Commonwealth Games
Shooters at the 2002 Commonwealth Games
Shooters at the 2006 Commonwealth Games
Commonwealth Games bronze medallists for Namibia
Namibian male sport shooters
ISSF pistol shooters
Olympic shooters of Namibia
People from Hardap Region
Commonwealth Games medallists in shooting
Medallists at the 2002 Commonwealth Games
Medallists at the 2006 Commonwealth Games